Now, Always, Never is the debut studio album by Bosnian alternative rock band Sikter. It was released on 21 November 2000 by Fis club Bock in Bosnia and Herzegovina and The Orchard in Europe and the United States.

Album was recorded during the summer 1998 in Pavarotti Music Centre, Mostar. Producers of album were frontman of the band Enes Zlatar, Austrian engineer Dietz Tinhof and English musician Brian Eno. 
Album is a fusion of a few genres: alternative rock, funk, alternative metal and soul.

Track listing

Personnel
Sikter
Enes Zlatar, vocals, keyboards, producer
Esad Bratović - guitars
Dejan Rokvić - bass, vocals, keyboards
Faris Arapović - drums
Additional musicians
Brian Eno - keyboards, vocals, producer
Pavarotti Music Center Choir
Production
Dietmar Tinhof - mixing
Samir Fočo - sound assistant
Oliver Dujmović - executive producer

References

External links
Now, Always, Never on Yahoo! Music
Now, Always, Never on MSN Music
Review in Croatian

2000 debut albums
Sikter albums
The Orchard (company) albums